The People's Council of the Luhansk People's Republic, is the regional parliament of the Luhansk People's Republic, a disputed federal subject of Russia.

History
The first legislative body of the Luhansk People's Republic was established by pro-Russian protesters in early April 2014.

2022
On 30 September 2022, Russia annexed the LPR, DPR, Kherson and Zaporizhznia regions. LPR parliament continues to exist.

References

Politics of the Luhansk People's Republic
Unicameral legislatures
Luhansk